Stavseng Lighthouse is a coastal lighthouse located in municipality of Kragerø, Vestfold og Telemark, Norway. It was established in 1874, automated in 1968, and was listed as a protected site in 1997.

See also

Lighthouses in Norway
List of lighthouses in Norway

References

External links
 
 Norsk Fyrhistorisk Forening 

Lighthouses completed in 1874
Lighthouses in Vestfold og Telemark
Listed lighthouses in Norway
Kragerø